Arimunding-Munding is a film by Excelsior Pictures, starring José Padilla, Jr. and Carmen Rosales. It was made in 1938 and premiered in 1939.

References

External links

1938 films
1938 drama films
Philippine drama films